Gaseous mediators are chemicals that are produced in small amounts by some cells of the mammalian body and have a number of biological signalling functions. There are three so-far-identified gaseous mediator molecules: nitric oxide (NO), hydrogen sulfide (H2S), and carbon monoxide (CO).

Clinical Applications 
Endogenous gaseous mediators have shown anti-inflammatory and cytoprotective properties Combination nonsteroidal anti-inflammatory drugs featuring both a cyclooxygenase inhibitor and gaseous mediator releasing component are being investigated as a safer alternative to current anti-inflammatory drugs due to their potential reduction in risk for gastrointestinal ulcer formation.

References

Biochemistry